Sarpugerði is a stadium in Norðragøta, Faroe Islands.  It is currently used mostly for football matches and is the home ground of Víkingur Gøta and has a capacity of 1,600 (440 seated).

References

External links
Sarpugerði photos and video - Nordic Stadiums
Pictures from europlan-online.de
Sarpugerði Stadium

Football venues in the Faroe Islands
GÍ Gøta
Víkingur Gøta